Thais Reiss de Araújo (born 9 December 1999) is a Brazilian professional footballer who plays as a midfielder and has been capped internationally for Brazil at youth level.

Early life 
Born in Curitiba, Brazil, Reiss attended Marista Santa Maria high school and captained the school's football team for four years. She played club football with Coritiba, winning five youth championships.

North Florida Ospreys 
In 2017, Reiss emigrated to the United States to study for a degree in sport management at the University of North Florida. She played five seasons of college soccer for the North Florida Ospreys, scoring 42 goals and 18 assists in 77 career appearances. Reiss was named ASUN Conference Freshman of the Year in 2017, ASUN Player of the Year in 2020, and earned ASUN All-Conference first-team honours four times. At the time of her departure she ranked second all-time in school history and 10th in ASUN Conference history for goals.

Club career

Orlando Pride 
Having gone undrafted in the 2022 NWSL Draft, Reiss trialled with Orlando Pride for preseason ahead of the 2022 season. She continued to train with the team and eventually signed a contract for the remainder of the season on 11 July 2022. She made her professional debut the following day as an 82nd-minute substitute in a 1–0 defeat away at Chicago Red Stars in the first game under interim head coach Seb Hines. She was released upon the expiry of her contract in November 2022 having made five appearances for the club.

International career 
In 2016, Reiss was a member of the Brazil under-17 squad at the 2016 FIFA U-17 Women's World Cup, playing the full 90 minutes of a group stage win over Nigeria. In 2018, she was called up to the Brazil under-20 squad for the 2018 FIFA U-20 Women's World Cup and played in all three group games. Brazil failed to progress from the group stage in both tournaments.

Career statistics

College

Club 
.

Honours
Individual
ASUN Conference Freshman of the Year: 2017
ASUN Conference Player of the Year: 2020

References

External links 
 North Florida Ospreys
 

 Due the COVID-19 pandemic, the NCAA postponed the 2020 season to spring of 2021.

1999 births
Living people
Footballers from Curitiba
Brazilian women's footballers
Women's association football midfielders
North Florida Ospreys women's soccer players
Orlando Pride players
National Women's Soccer League players
Brazilian expatriate women's footballers
Brazilian expatriate sportspeople in the United States
Expatriate women's soccer players in the United States